George Speaker Mickelson (January 31, 1941April 19, 1993) was an American politician and Vietnam War veteran who served as the 28th governor of South Dakota from 1987 until his death in 1993 in a plane crash near Zwingle, Iowa.

His father, George T. Mickelson, was also governor of South Dakota, from 1947 to 1951. To date, the Mickelsons are the only father-son duo to have held that office. He is a member of the prominent Mickelson family of South Dakota.

Early life and education
Mickelson was born in Mobridge, South Dakota. His grandfather was a Norwegian immigrant. His parents, George Theodore Mickelson and Madge Mickelson, were the Governor and First Lady of South Dakota from 1947 to 1951.

Mickelson graduated from the University of South Dakota with a bachelor's in business administration in 1963 and from the University of South Dakota School of Law in 1965. He was a brother in Lambda Chi Alpha fraternity at USD. He served in the United States Army, including a tour of duty in Vietnam. He married Linda McCahren and they had three children, Amy, David and Mark.

Public service and plane crash
Mickelson served as South Dakota State Assistant Attorney General (1967–68) and South Dakota State Attorney, Brookings County (1971–74). First elected to the South Dakota House of Representatives in 1974, he held office there for six years, serving as Speaker for the final two years. Mickelson was elected governor in 1986 and reelected four years later.

On April 19, 1993, Mickelson was one of eight people aboard a state-owned airplane returning to South Dakota from a lobbying effort in Ohio. The plane, a Mitsubishi MU-2 turboprop, reported engine trouble while flying near Dubuque, Iowa, and crashed into a farm silo about four miles south of Zwingle. Everyone on the plane was killed. Mickelson was succeeded as governor by then-Lieutenant Governor Walter Dale Miller. The crash happened on the same day as the end of the Waco siege, which overshadowed it in national news coverage.

Legacy
George S. Mickelson Middle School in Brookings is named after him, as is the George S. Mickelson Trail in the Black Hills and the George S. Mickelson Center for the Neurosciences in Yankton, South Dakota. The George S. Mickelson Education Center at Southeast Technical Institute in Sioux Falls, South Dakota, was built in 1990. The George S. Mickelson Great Service Award is given out annually by the South Dakota Office of Tourism. His alma mater, the University of South Dakota, awards academically talented South Dakota students with high ACTs/SATs a full-tuition scholarship known as the George S. Mickelson Scholarship. It is the university's most prestigious scholarship.

See also
George S. Mickelson Trail

References

External links
George S. Mickelson Great Service Award
Governor George S. Mickelson portrait
New York Times Obituary: Governor George Mickelson 4/21/1993
National Governors Association
Dubuque, IA Area Governors Plane Crashes, Apr 1993 at GenDisasters.com
 

|-

|-

1941 births
1993 deaths
20th-century American lawyers
20th-century American politicians
1992 United States presidential electors
Accidental deaths in Iowa
Methodists from South Dakota
American people of Norwegian descent
District attorneys in South Dakota
Republican Party governors of South Dakota
People from Mobridge, South Dakota
Republican Party members of the South Dakota House of Representatives
South Dakota lawyers
Speakers of the South Dakota House of Representatives
United States Army personnel of the Vietnam War
United States Army soldiers
University of South Dakota School of Law alumni
University of South Dakota alumni
Victims of aviation accidents or incidents in 1993
Victims of aviation accidents or incidents in the United States